John Lee Hooker Sings the Blues is a 1961 album by John Lee Hooker and released by Crown Records under the label reference of CLP 5232. The album was produced in 1960 by Orrin Keepnews, and featured jazz bassist Sam Jones and drummer Louis Hayes from Cannonball Adderley's band.

Track listing
2Hug & Squeeze You"
"I Love You Baby"
"The Syndicate"
"Boogie Woogie All Night Long"
"Good Rockin Mama"
"Let Your Daddy Ride"
"Turn Over A New Leaf"
"Don't You Remember Me"
"Driftin From Door To Door"
"She Left Me On My Bended Knee"

References

1961 albums
John Lee Hooker albums